St John the Baptist Church is the Church of England parish church of Chipping Barnet, Greater London. It forms part of the Chipping Barnet Team Ministry, comprising St Mark's, Barnet Vale, St Peter's, Arkley and St Stephen's, Bell's Hill. It crowns the ascent up Barnet Hill, and stands at the junction of Wood Street and High Street. It is one of the few Anglican churches in Greater London to belong to the Diocese of St Albans.

History

The evidence for a church comes from the Manor Court records which show that a chapel was in existence in 1272, built to serve the needs of the people of the village, the market and those who passed through. It is assumed that the building had been built around 1250. The first mention of a priest was in 1258, when it was noted that the 'Parson of Barnet' owned a copy of the works of the Latin poet, Ovid. At the time Chipping Barnet was chapel-of-ease to the much older parish church of St Mary the Virgin in East Barnet. It was only in 1866 that the livings were separated by an Order in Council.

The church stands in what was the centre of the town. It was rebuilt by John de la Moote, abbot of St Albans, about 1400, the architect being Beauchamp. Playing on its antiquity, it continues to call itself "Barnet Church", although this is not an official title. It is in fact the parish church of Chipping Barnet only, whilst Christ Church is the parish church of High Barnet.

The church was extensively renovated by William Butterfield  in 1871/2, at which time the tomb of Thomas Ravenscroft, a local benefactor who died in 1630, was moved from the chancel to a newly built chapel.

During the mid-twentieth century, the roof of St John the Baptist was repaired, and Church House was restored. A fire in 1974 severely damaged the choir vestry, then under the tower, and threatened to destroy the whole building. It was put out just in time, and in the aftermath, ideas came forward for some of the changes which were put into effect in 1984. These included new glass doors as the main entrance under the tower, the creation of a new choir vestry and alterations to the organ.

Fr Sam Rossiter-Peters was licensed as vicar on November 9th, 2021. He followed on from Fr Chris Ferris, who was installed on September 1st, 2014. Ferris's predecessor's final service took place on 17th November, 2013.

Building
St John the Baptist, the ancient parish church of Chipping Barnet, consists of a nave and aisles separated by clustered columns which support four pointed arches; a chancel with an east window of good Perpendicular tracery; a vestry, built in the reign of James I by Thomas Ravenscroft; and at the west end, a low, square embattled tower. In 1679, James Ravenscroft (son of Thomas) established a charity, which provides funds for the repair and maintenance of the tomb of Thomas Ravenscroft and his wife Thomasina.

Since 1950, the church has been a Grade II* listed building.

Music
The Choir at St John the Baptist Barnet has a long tradition of choral music, the Organist and Choirmaster is currently Terence Atkins. He has held the post for over 40 years. The Assistant Organist, Alan Parish has been at St Johns for even longer.

The Choir sing Concerts throughout the year as well as Evensong every Sunday. Annually they are the Resident choir in many of the countries cathedrals; singing the services for a week while the cathedral choir is on holiday.
St John the Baptist Barnet also has a large Organ which is regularly used for recitals. The previous Organ Scholar – Ashley Wagner, is currently the Organ Scholar at Worcester Cathedral after a year as Organ Scholar at Birmingham Cathedral. Ben Markovic is the current Organ Scholar at St Johns – Barnet.

Annually, the church welcomes a service of music, a "Christmas concert" from the Queen Elizabeth's grammar school for boys which is a 10 minutes walk from the site. The church has also played host to the High Barnet Chamber Music Festival.

Status
The living of Barnet is a curacy, held with the rectory of East Barnet till the death of the last incumbent in 1866, when the livings were separated. The parish of Chipping Barnet, served by St John's Church, was provided with a chapel-of-ease in Victorian times; subsequently Chipping Barnet parish was split in two, and the chapel-of-ease (on Bells Hill, Barnet) raised to the status of a parish church, dedicated to St Stephen.

References

External links

 St. John the Baptist, Chipping Barnet Stiffleaf Photography, Hertfordshire's churches 
 High Barnet Church, St John the Baptist - Monuments The Second Website of Bob Speel, Former Hertfordshire church monuments

Church of England church buildings in the London Borough of Barnet
Diocese of St Albans
15th-century church buildings in England
Grade II* listed churches in London
Grade II* listed buildings in the London Borough of Barnet
John the Baptist
History of the London Borough of Barnet
Ravenscroft family
John the Baptist